Michael I (Russian: Михаил Фёдорович Романов, Mikhaíl Fyódorovich Románov) became the first Russian tsar of the House of Romanov after the Zemskiy Sobor of 1613 elected him to rule the Tsardom of Russia. 

He was the son of Feodor Nikitich Romanov (later known as Patriarch Filaret) and of Xenia Shestova (later known as "the great nun" Martha). He was also a first cousin once removed of the last Rurikid Tsar Feodor I through his great-aunt Anastasia Romanovna, who was the mother of Feodor I, and through marriage, a great-nephew in-law with Tsar Ivan IV of Russia. His accession marked the end of the Time of Troubles. During his reign, Russia conquered most of Siberia with the help of the Cossacks and the Stroganov family. Russia had extended from the vicinity of the Ural Mountains to the Pacific Ocean by the end of Michael's reign.

Life and reign
Michael's grandfather, Nikita, was brother to the first Russian Tsaritsa Anastasia and a central advisor to Ivan the Terrible. As a young boy, Michael and his mother had been exiled to Beloozero in 1600. This was a result of the recently elected Tsar Boris Godunov, in 1598, falsely accusing his father, Feodor, of treason. This may have been partly because Feodor had married Ksenia Shestova against Boris's wishes.

Election 
Michael was eventually chosen for the throne of Muscovy due to his father's martyr-like captivity in Polish detention, as the patriotic mood swept the Russian elite since the expulsion of the Poles during the Time of Troubles. Michael's youth also contributed to his election as he was seen easy to be manipulated. On 21 February 1613, 700 delegates reached a consensus for Michael to be chosen as a compromise candidate as Tsar of Russia by the Zemsky Sobor of 1613.

The delegates of the council did not discover the young Tsar and his mother at the Ipatiev Monastery near Kostroma until 24 March. He had been chosen after several other options had been removed, including Polish prince Vladislav, Austrian Archduke Maximilian III and the Swedish prince Carl Philip. Initially, Martha protested, believing and stating that her son was too young and tender for so difficult an office, and in such a troublesome time.

According to Dunning, "The sixteen-year-old boy did not impress the boyars at all; he was poorly educated and not particularly intelligent. Nonetheless, those great lords consoled themselves with the knowledge that Trubetskoi would not become tsar and that Mikhail's ambitious and highly intelligent father, Filaret, was still in Polish captivity. One of the boyars allegedly said at the time, 'Let us have Misha Romanov for he is young and not yet wise; he will suit our purposes.' In fact, under the strong influence of reactionary boyars, even in preparation for his coronation, the deeply conservative new tsar revealed his true feelings about his subjects by snubbing many patriots simply because they were commoners." The tsar's family relationship with False Dmitry I, False Dmitry II, and Prince Wladyslaw was covered up, even the two years Mikhail spent in the Polish-occupied Kremlin with his collaborator uncle Ivan Romanov.

Michael's election and accession to the throne form the basis of the Ivan Susanin legend, which Russian composer Mikhail Glinka dramatized in his opera A Life for the Tsar.

He was crowned on 21 July 1613, on his seventeenth birthday. The first task of the new tsar was to clear the land of the countries occupying it. Sweden and Poland were then dealt with respectively by the peace of Stolbovo (17 February 1617) and the Truce of Deulino (1 December 1618). 

The most important result of the Truce of Deulino was the return from Polish captivity of the Tsar's father, Patriarch Filaret. Filaret became the effective ruler of Russia until his death in 1633.

Reign 
Michael's reign saw the greatest territorial expansion in Russian history. During his reign, the conquest of Siberia continued, largely accomplished by the Cossacks and financed by the Stroganov merchant family.

Tsar Michael suffered from a progressive leg injury (a consequence of a horse accident early in his life), which resulted in his not being able to walk towards the end of his life. He was a gentle and pious prince who gave little trouble to anyone and effaced himself behind his counsellors.  Sometimes they were relatively honest and capable men like his father; sometimes they were corrupted and bigoted, like the Saltykov relatives of his mother. He was married twice. He was married off to Princess Maria Vladimirovna Dolgorukova in 1624, but she became ill, and died in early 1625, only four months after the marriage. In 1626, he married Eudoxia Streshneva (1608–1645), who bore him 10 children, of whom four reached adulthood: the future Tsar Alexis and the Tsarevnas Irina, Anna, and Tatyana. Michael's failure to wed his eldest daughter, Irina, with Count Valdemar Christian of Schleswig-Holstein, a morganatic son of King Christian IV of Denmark, in consequence of the refusal of the latter to accept Orthodoxy, so deeply afflicted him as to contribute to bringing about his death. Tsar Michael fell ill in April 1645, with scurvy, dropsy, and probably depression. His doctors prescribed purgatives which did not improve his condition; and after fainting in church on 12 July, he died on 23 July 1645.

Michael's governments

The two government offices (prikazes) that were most important politically were the Posolsky Prikaz ("Foreign Office") and the Razryadny Prikaz (a Duma chancellery and a personnel department for both central and provincial administration including military command). Those offices could be pivotal in struggles between boyar factions, so they were traditionally headed not by boyars but by dyaki (professional clerks).

The first head of the Posolsky Prikaz under Michael was Pyotr Tretyakov until his death in 1618; he conducted a policy of allying with Sweden against Poland. The next, Ivan Gramotin had a reputation for being a Polonophile; this appointment was necessary to bring forth Filaret's release from captivity. In the mid-1620s Filaret began preparations for war with Poland; Gramotin fell into disfavour and was dismissed and exiled in 1626. The same fate was shared by Efim Telepnev in 1630 and Fedor Likhachov in 1631 – they too tried to mitigate Filaret's belligerent approach. Ivan Gryazev, appointed in 1632, was promoted from the second rank of the bureaucracy to carry out Filaret's orders. After the deaths of Filaret and Gryazev, the post was once again assumed by Gramotin in 1634, and after his retirement in 1635, by Likhachov, who undertook a general course of pacification.

The Razryadny Prikaz was first headed by Sydavny Vasilyev; Filaret replaced him with his fellow in captivity Tomilo Lugovskoy, but the latter somehow provoked Filaret's anger and was sent into exile. In 1623, Fedor Likhachov was appointed head of the prikaz until his move to the Posolsky Prikaz, and, in 1630, the Razryad was given to Ivan Gavrenev, an outstanding administrator who held this post for 30 years.

Three other key offices were the Streletsky Prikaz (in charge of the streltsy, regiments who served as Moscow's garrison), the Prikaz bolshoy kazny, minister of the treasury, and the Aptekarsky Prikaz ("Pharmacy Office", a de facto ministry of health, most particularly the tsar's health). After Filaret's arrival, their former heads were sent away from Moscow, and all three given to Ivan Cherkassky (Filaret's nephew), who proved to be an able and competent administrator and was a de facto prime minister until his death in 1642. Fedor Sheremetev, who had succeeded to all of Cherkassky's posts was a rather weak figure; real power lay in the hands of a court marshal, Alexey Lvov.

Issue
From his marriage to Eudoxia Streshneva, Michael fathered 10 children:

See also
Rulers of Russia family tree

References

Notes

Further reading

 Belyaev Ivan D. (1846) (in Russian). On the Russian army in the reign of Michael Feodorovich and after him, to the transformations made by Peter the Great (О русском войске в царствование Михаила Феодоровича и после его, до преобразований, сделанных Петром Великим) at Runivers.ru in DjVu and PDF formats.

External links

 Romanovs: The first film. Michael I, Alexis I – Historical reconstruction "The Romanovs". StarMedia. Babich-Design (Russia, 2013)

Michael 01 of Russia
Michael 01 of Russia
17th-century Russian monarchs
Russian tsars
House of Romanov
Eastern Orthodox monarchs
Russian people of the Polish–Muscovite War (1605–1618)